The Box is a 1975 Australian film, based on the Australian soap opera The Box and featuring much of the same cast. The film also features Graham Kennedy playing himself, and Cornelia Frances in the key role of Dr. S. M. Winter, an efficiency expert brought in to improve operations at UCV-12. Robin Ramsay played Winter's assistant Bruce. Marilyn Vernon as starlet Ingrid O'Toole, and Leonie Bradley, credited as "Nature Girl", provide nude glimpses, as does the returning Belinda Giblin. Keith Lee played Price, and Robert Forza appeared as Channel 12's clapper loader.

Plot
Channel 12 is in financial difficulties. The company board calls the bluff of managing director Sir Henry Usher (Fred Betts), forcing him to call in a systems expert to improve station operations. Station staff are initially surprised to learn that the expert, Dr Winter, is a woman, named Sheila (Cornelia Frances). Various attempts to first impress, and then to hinder Dr Winter end disastrously. A feature film, Manhunt, directed by Lee Whiteman and starring Tony Wild, is produced with hopes to increasing station income. Thanks to Wild's ineptitude the resultant footage is a disaster but the film finds unexpected success when reworked as a comedy.

Production
The film was shot on 35 mm on new sets at Crawford Productions' Abbotsford studios over four weeks in early 1975. Part of the budget was contributed by the Australian Film Development Corporation. Marilyn Vernon appeared in several full frontal scenes that were probably deemed unsuitable for TV while Belinda Giblin was seen topless again just as she had been in the TV series.

See also
 List of films based on television programs

References

External links
The Box at IMDb
The Box at Oz Movies

1975 films
Australian drama films
1975 drama films
Films based on television series
Films set in Victoria (Australia)
1970s English-language films